Álvaro dos Santos Filho (born 22 October 1911, date of death unknown) was a Brazilian sports shooter. He competed at the 1948 Summer Olympics, 1952 Summer Olympics and 1960 Summer Olympics.

References

External links
 

 
1911 births
Year of death missing
Brazilian male sport shooters
Olympic shooters of Brazil
Shooters at the 1948 Summer Olympics
Shooters at the 1952 Summer Olympics
Shooters at the 1960 Summer Olympics
Sportspeople from Minas Gerais
Pan American Games medalists in shooting
Pan American Games bronze medalists for Brazil
Shooters at the 1963 Pan American Games
20th-century Brazilian people